National Sanctity of Human Life Day is an observance declared by several United States Presidents who opposed abortion typically proclaimed on or near the anniversary of the Supreme Court's decision in Roe v. Wade.

History
President Ronald Reagan issued a presidential proclamation on January 13, 1984, designating Sunday, January 22, 1984 as National Sanctity of Human Life Day, noting that it was the 11th anniversary of Roe v. Wade, in which the Supreme Court issued a ruling that guaranteed women access to abortion. President Reagan was a strong anti-abortion advocate who said that in Roe v. Wade the Supreme Court "struck down our laws protecting the lives of unborn children".

Reagan issued the proclamation annually thereafter, designating Sanctity of Human Life Day to be the closest Sunday to the original January 22 date. His successor, George H. W. Bush, continued the annual proclamation throughout his presidency. Bush's successor, Bill Clinton, discontinued the practice throughout his eight years in office, but Bush's son and Clinton's successor, George W. Bush, resumed the proclamation and did so every year of his presidency.

At the end of the first year of his presidency, Donald Trump issued a proclamation declaring Monday, January 22, 2018 to be National Sanctity of Human Life Day; however, the next year, his proclamation set it again to a Sunday, that being January 20, 2019. 

The day is observed in some churches as Sanctity of Human Life Sunday, including in some parishes of the Lutheran Church–Missouri Synod.

According to the Proper Calendar  of the Catholic Church in the United States, as requested by the United States Conference of Catholic Bishops (USCCB) and approved by the Holy See, 22 January (or the 23rd if the 22nd is a Sunday) is observed as the "Day of Prayer for the Legal Protection of Unborn Children".

Response
In an amicus brief filed by the National Lawyers Association in the case of Elk Grove Unified School District v. Newdow, National Sanctity of Human Life Day was cited as an instance of the executive branch acknowledging the theistic philosophy of the United States government.

See also
Abortion and religion
Abortion debate
Abortion in the United States
Abortion-rights movements
List of observances in the United States by presidential proclamation

References

External links
Proclamations

Proclamation 5147, 1984
Proclamation 5292, 1985
Proclamation 5430, 1986
Proclamation 5599, 1987
Proclamation 5761, 1988
Proclamation 5931, 1989
Proclamation 6090, 1990
Proclamation 6241, 1991
Proclamation 6397, 1991 (for 1992)
Proclamation 6521, 1993
Proclamation 7520, 2002
Proclamation 7639, 2003
Proclamation 7752, 2004
Proclamation 7863, 2005
Proclamation 7975, 2006
Proclamation 8101, 2007
Proclamation 8217, 2008
Proclamation 8339, 2009
Proclamation 9691, 2018
Proclamation 9838, 2019
Proclamation 9978, 2020
Proclamation 10136, 2021

Anti-abortion movement
Abortion in the United States
Observances in the United States by presidential proclamation
January observances 
Holidays and observances by scheduling (nth weekday of the month)